The House of Citizen-Memorial Hall of Attendance is a hall in Douliu City, Yunlin County, Taiwan.

History

Empire of Japan
The establishment of the hall originated from the Crown Prince Hirohito's visit to Taiwan in 1923. The construction of the hall was initiated by Wu Keming, with funds he raised from community donations and government funds. Construction was completed in 1926. The hall then served as a commemoration for the Crown Prince's visit. It also became a public gathering venue for residents for meetings, seminars, banquets, and performances.

Republic of China
After the handover of Taiwan from Japan to the Republic of China in 1945, the building was leased to several companies such as Groundwater Company, Chiayi Motor Vehicle Office Douliu Subdivision, and Public Employees Mart. The building was badly damaged during the 1999 Jiji earthquake. In 2001, the building was declared a historical monument and renovation works were carried out to repair all of the damages caused by the earthquake. The works were completed in 2006. In October 2011, the Yunlin County Government officially commenced the operation of the building and renamed it the House of Citizen-Memorial Hall of Attendance. In March 2016, the management of the building was given back to Douliu City Office.

Events
The hall regularly held music performances and movie screenings.

Transportation
The hall is accessible within walking distance south of Douliu Station of Taiwan Railways.

See also
 List of tourist attractions in Taiwan

References

2011 establishments in Taiwan
Buildings and structures in Yunlin County
Monuments and memorials in Taiwan
Tourist attractions in Yunlin County